Anthony Lawrence Horton (13 July 1938 - 9 March 2020) was an  international rugby union player.

Horton was capped seven  times as a prop for England between 1965 and 1967 and was selected for the 1968 British Lions tour to South Africa, where he played in three of the four international matches against .

He played club rugby for Blackheath.

References

1938 births
2020 deaths
English rugby union players
British & Irish Lions rugby union players from England
Rugby union props
England international rugby union players
Surrey RFU players